Omar Ali may refer to:

 Omar Ali (poet) (1939–2015), Bangladeshi poet
 Omar Said Ali (born 1945), Kurdish politician
 Omar A. Ali, Somali entrepreneur
 Omar H. Ali (born 1971), historian of the African diaspora
 Omar Ali (Ghanaian footballer) (born 1992), Ghanaian footballer